The Tennessee Derby is a discontinued American Thoroughbred horse race that was run annually from 1884 to 1886 and then 1890–1906 at the Montgomery Park Race Track located on the Memphis Fairgrounds in Tennessee. The Tennessee Derby rivaled the Kentucky Derby at the time for prestige and purse money, but was not reinstated after a gambling ban took effect in 1907. Kentucky Derby winners Joe Cotton and Agile also won the Tennessee Derby.

The final edition of the Tennessee Derby was run on April 24, 1906 and was won by Lady Navarre.

Records
Speed record: (at 1-1/8 miles)
1:55.75 - Berclair (1896)

Most wins by a jockey:
 2 - Nash Turner (1886, 1899)
 2 - Tommy Britton (1891, 1892)
 2 - Tommy Burns (1898, 1906)

Most wins by an owner:
 2 - Hiram J. Scoggan (1891, 1900)
 2 - Dr. Edwin F. McLean (1894, 1896)
 2 - Samuel S. Brown (1904, 1905)

Winners

References

 April 5, 1904 New York Times article on Proceeds winning the Tennessee Derby

Horse races in the United States
Discontinued horse races in the United States
1884 establishments in Tennessee
Recurring sporting events established in 1884
1906 disestablishments in Tennessee
Recurring events disestablished in 1906